Richard Ellef Ayoade (born 23 May 1977) is a British filmmaker, actor, comedian and broadcaster. He played the role of socially awkward IT technician Maurice Moss in Channel 4 sitcom The IT Crowd (2006–2013), for which he won the 2014 BAFTA for Best Male Comedy Performance.

From 1998 to 1999, Ayoade was the president of the Footlights club whilst a student at the University of Cambridge. He and Matthew Holness debuted their respective characters Dean Learner and Garth Marenghi at the Edinburgh Festival Fringe in 2000, bringing the characters to television with Garth Marenghi's Darkplace (2004) and Man to Man with Dean Learner (2006). He appeared in the comedy shows The Mighty Boosh (2004–2007) and Nathan Barley (2005). After directing music videos for Kasabian, Arctic Monkeys, Vampire Weekend, and Yeah Yeah Yeahs, he wrote and directed the comedy-drama film Submarine (2010), an adaptation of the 2008 novel by Joe Dunthorne. He co-starred in the American science fiction comedy film The Watch (2012) and his second film as a writer and director, the black comedy The Double (2013), drew inspiration from Fyodor Dostoevsky's novella of the same title.

Ayoade has frequently appeared on panel shows, mostly prominently on The Big Fat Quiz of the Year, and served as a team captain on Was It Something I Said? (2013). He presented the factual shows Gadget Man (2013–2015), its spin-off Travel Man (2015–2019), and the revival of The Crystal Maze (2017-2020). He has also voiced characters in a number of animated projects, including the films The Boxtrolls (2014), Early Man (2018), The Lego Movie 2: The Second Part (2019), Soul (2020), and The Bad Guys (2022), as well as the series Strange Hill High (2013–2014), Apple & Onion (2018–2021), and Disenchantment (2021).

Ayoade has written three comedic film–focused books: Ayoade on Ayoade: A Cinematic Odyssey (2014), The Grip of Film (2017), and Ayoade on Top (2019). He is currently writing two children's books: The Book That No One Wanted to Read (2022) and a picture book called The Fairy Tale Fan Club (TBD).

Ayoade often works alongside Julian Barratt, Matt Berry, Noel Fielding, Matthew Holness, and Rich Fulcher.

Early life

Richard Ellef Ayoade was born in Hammersmith, London on 23 May 1977, the son of a Norwegian mother and Nigerian father. The family moved to Ipswich when he was young. At the age of 15, he developed an interest in film "beyond Star Wars and Back to the Future" and began exploring the works of directors Woody Allen, Ingmar Bergman, and Federico Fellini. He studied at the independent St Joseph's College in Ipswich, where he recalls being "obsessed" with J. D. Salinger's book The Catcher in the Rye. He was so obsessed with the book that he started to dress like its protagonist, Holden Caulfield.

From 1995 to 1998, Ayoade studied law at St Catharine's College, Cambridge, where he won the Martin Steele Prize for play production and was president of the amateur theatrical club Footlights. He and Footlights vice-president John Oliver wrote and performed in several productions together, appearing in both Footlights' 1997 and 1998 touring shows: Emotional Baggage (directed by Matthew Holness) and Between a Rock and a Hard Place (directed by Cal McCrystal). Ayoade says that his parents would not approve of studies considered to be of the "Regency era", adding that "a non-vocational degree seemed such an outlandish indulgence". He said that his degree in law was no longer a viable "fallback" for him and that he would need to "go back to square one".

Career

2000–2006: Garth Marenghi shows and The Mighty Boosh 
Ayoade co-wrote the stage show Garth Marenghi's Fright Knight with Matthew Holness, whom he also met at the Footlights, appearing in the show with Holness at the Edinburgh Fringe in 2000 where it was nominated for a Perrier Award. The show saw the debut of Holness' character Garth Marenghi, a fictional horror writer, and Ayoade's character Dean Learner, Marenghi's publisher. In 2001, he won the Perrier Comedy Award for co-writing and performing in Garth Marenghi's Netherhead, the sequel to Fright Knight. In 2004, Ayoade and Holness took the Marenghi character to Channel 4, creating the spoof horror comedy series Garth Marenghi's Darkplace. Ayoade wrote, directed and appeared in the series, which saw Marenghi and Learner star in a 1980s television drama that was never broadcast. Learner played Thornton Reed, a hospital administrator. Along with Matt Berry, Ayoade directed, co-wrote and co-starred in AD/BC: A Rock Opera, which parodies life-of-Christ rock operas and aired on BBC Three in December 2004. Ayoade was also a writer on the sketch show Bruiser in 2000, which starred former Footlights president David Mitchell and Robert Webb, and featured Holness. Ayoade was featured in a bit-part as a reporter in the HBO television film The Life and Death of Peter Sellers (2004).

After appearing in Julian Barratt and Noel Fielding's radio series The Boosh, Ayoade was part of the original cast of Barratt and Fielding's The Mighty Boosh television show. He was originally selected to play the role of dangerous villain Dixon Bainbridge. However, by the time the radio series transferred to television he was under contract by Channel 4 and was only able to act in the pilot before leaving The Boosh. The part was taken by fellow Darkplace actor and eventual IT Crowd co-star Matt Berry. He later returned in the second series in 2005, to play the part of the belligerent shaman Saboo. Ayoade continued his association with The Mighty Boosh in the third series, reprising his role and acting as script editor.  In 2005, he played the role of Ned Smanks in Chris Morris' and Charlie Brooker's sitcom Nathan Barley. Ayoade's Dean Learner character was resurrected in 2006 to host a comedy chat show, Man to Man with Dean Learner, on Channel 4. The different guests were played each week by Holness. Ayoade appeared in the satirical comedy series Time Trumpet in 2006, which is set in the year 2031 and saw Ayoade and other celebrities reminiscing about the year 2007 onwards.

2006–2010: The IT Crowd, music videos, and Submarine 
In February 2006, Ayoade began playing technically brilliant, but socially awkward, IT technician Maurice Moss in the sitcom The IT Crowd on Channel 4, appearing with Chris O'Dowd, Katherine Parkinson, Chris Morris, and later on, Matt Berry. The series' creator Graham Linehan wrote the part specifically for Ayoade. In 2008, Ayoade won the award for an outstanding actor in a television comedy series at the Monte-Carlo Television Festival for his performance. In 2009, Ayoade co-starred with Joel McHale in the pilot for an American version of The IT Crowd, reprising his role with the same appearance and personality; however, no series was commissioned, and the pilot never aired. The original The IT Crowd ran for four seasons until 2010, with a special airing in 2013, for which Ayoade won a BAFTA for Best Male Comedy Performance.

In 2007, he directed the music videos for the songs "Fluorescent Adolescent" by Arctic Monkeys and Super Furry Animals's "Run-Away", which starred Matt Berry. The former received a UK Music Video Award nomination, attributed by Ayoade only to the song being "so good".  Ayoade has frequently appeared as a panellist on The Big Fat Quiz of the Year, often with Noel Fielding, making his first appearance on The Big Fat Anniversary Quiz in 2007, which marked Channel 4's 25th anniversary.

In 2008, Ayoade directed the music videos for two Vampire Weekend singles: "Oxford Comma", filmed in one long take, and "Cape Cod Kwassa Kwassa". That year he also directed videos for The Last Shadow Puppets songs "Standing Next to Me" and "My Mistakes Were Made for You", the latter of which was inspired by Federico Fellini's Toby Dammit.  He directed a live Arctic Monkeys DVD, At the Apollo (2008), recorded at the Manchester Apollo on super 16mm film. It was previewed at Vue cinemas across the UK in October 2008 and released on DVD the next month. Ayoade was featured in Paul King's 2009 film Bunny and the Bull, playing an extremely boring museum tour guide. That year he also directed two music videos for the Arctic Monkeys, "Crying Lightning" and "Cornerstone", and videos for Kasabian's "Vlad the Impaler", starring Fielding, and "Heads Will Roll" by the Yeah Yeah Yeahs.

In 2010, Ayoade made his debut directorial feature, Submarine, a coming-of-age comedy-drama he adapted from Joe Dunthorne's 2008 novel of the same name. The film stars newcomers Craig Roberts and Yasmin Paige with Sally Hawkins, Noah Taylor, and Paddy Considine. It follows Welsh teenager Oliver Tate (Roberts) as he becomes infatuated with a classmate (Paige) and the turmoil of his parents' failing relationship. Produced by Warp Films and Film4, it premiered at the 35th Toronto International Film Festival in September 2010, had a general release in the UK in March 2011, and was released in June in the US after being picked up by the Weinstein Company for North America. Arctic Monkeys and The Last Shadow Puppets frontman Alex Turner contributed five original songs to the soundtrack, inspired by Simon & Garfunkel's music in The Graduate (1967). The film was positively received by critics, with The Guardian critic Peter Bradshaw calling Ayoade a "tremendous new voice in British film". Ayoade was nominated for a BAFTA for Outstanding Debut by a British Writer, Director or Producer at the 65th British Academy Film Awards.

2011–present: Mainstream cinema, satirical writing, and television presenting 
In 2011, Ayoade directed the Community episode "Critical Film Studies" in the comedy show's second season. The episode pays homage to the 1981 film My Dinner with Andre and was named the "most brilliant half-hour of TV to arrive in this century" by Rolling Stone writer Rob Sheffield. Ayoade then directed a performance of comedian Tommy Tiernan's world stand-up tour, Crooked Man, which was released in November 2011. Ayoade provided his voice to the main cast of Channel 4's ill-received animated sitcom Full English, which aired for just five episodes in 2012 before being cancelled. Ayoade starred opposite Ben Stiller, Vince Vaughn, and Jonah Hill in the science fiction comedy The Watch as a neighbourhood watch group that uncovers alien forces threatening the world. The film was not well received by critics, although Ayoade's performance was praised. Keith Phipps of The A.V. Club felt the film's "brightest spots" came courtesy of Ayoade, while Michael Phillips of the Chicago Tribune felt Ayoade was "the reason it's not entirely lame". Also in 2012, Ayoade began voicing Todd Lagoona, an anthropomorphic hammerhead shark who was a recurring character in Noel Fielding's Luxury Comedy.

From 2013 to 2014, Ayoade voiced Templeton, the class nerd, in the CBBC animated series Strange Hill High. He replaced Stephen Fry as presenter in the second series of Channel 4's Gadget Man in September 2013, and also presented a third and fourth season. The series featured Ayoade presenting a variety of innovative products and gadgets. He was also the host of the spin-off series Travel Man, where he spent 48 hours in a different location each episode with a celebrity guest. He was a team captain on the Channel 4 panel show Was It Something I Said?, which began airing October 2013 and co-starred David Mitchell as host and Micky Flanagan as fellow team captain. Also in 2013, Ayoade read Roald Dahl's children book The Twits for Penguin Audio's audiobook collection and Virgin Media launched an advertising campaign starring the Jamaican sprinter Usain Bolt featuring the voice of Ayoade. He provided the voice-over for Apple's iPhone 6 UK campaign with Chris O'Dowd in 2014. He also appears on Channel 4's 8 out of 10 Cats Does Countdown, usually at least once per season.

Ayoade's second feature film, the black comedy thriller The Double, was based on Fyodor Dostoyevsky's 1846 novella The Double; it was written by Ayoade and Avi Korine and stars Jesse Eisenberg and Mia Wasikowska. It concerns a timid man who becomes frustrated by the appearance of his charming doppelgänger, both of whom are played by Eisenberg. It was released in April 2014 to generally positive reviews, drawing comparisons to Terry Gilliam's Brazil (1985) in its visuals and narrative. In the stop-motion animated fantasy film The Boxtrolls (2014), Ayoade voiced Mr. Pickles, a henchman to the film's antagonist Snatcher (voiced by Ben Kingsley).

Ayoade's first book, Ayoade on Ayoade: A Cinematic Odyssey, was published by Faber and Faber in October 2014. It parodies Faber's Directors on Directors series, where critically celebrated filmmakers discuss their work, and sees Ayoade conduct several fictional interviews with himself where he discusses his work and enthusiasm for the world of cinema. Ayoade voiced a villainous snowman in several episodes of the 2015 reboot of the animated series Danger Mouse. In June 2016, he directed a short music video for the Radiohead song "Tinker Tailor Soldier Sailor Rich Man Poor Man Beggar Man Thief", as part of a series of video vignettes to promote their album A Moon Shaped Pool.

Ayoade took over as host of the Channel 4 game show The Crystal Maze in 2017, following the success of a celebrity charity special revival hosted by Stephen Merchant. His style of presenting has been described as being "a more cerebral and intense version" of his IT Crowd character, Maurice Moss. Ayoade made a cameo appearance in the comedy sequel Paddington 2  as a forensic investigator in 2017 and was amongst the voice cast for Vampire Weekend Ezra Koenig's animated series Neo Yokio in the same year. His second book, The Grip Of Film,  was published in October 2017. Written in the perspective of clueless film fanatic Gordy LaSure, in its canon is an A-Z of films and what makes them good with footnotes by Ayoade. Beginning in late 2017, he has guest hosted a number of episodes of the panel show Have I Got News for You. Ayoade starred in an advertisement for HSBC in 2018, which addressed other countries' cultural impact on the United Kingdom ahead of Brexit; appearing in four more in the following years Ayoade voiced Treebor, a Stone Age caveman, in the Aardman Animations stop-motion comedy Early Man (2018).

Since February 2018, Ayoade has voiced Onion, one of the title characters in the Cartoon Network animated series Apple & Onion. He also returned to music video directing in 2018, helming the science fiction-inspired  video for The Breeders song "Spacewoman". Ayoade was featured in a supporting role as a pompous artist in both parts of Joanna Hogg's two-part drama The Souvenir. He lent his voice as a talking ice cream cone to the animated comedy sequel The Lego Movie 2: The Second Part (2019)–which also featured Noel Fielding– and the English version of the Finnish series Moominvalley. Ayoade provided voice work for the Star Wars Disney+ series The Mandalorian (2019) where he voiced the droid Zero in a recurring role. He also lent his voice for the animated adult fantasy sitcom Disenchantment (2021) on Netflix where he voiced the character Alva Gunderson.

Ayoade on Top, his third book published by Faber and Faber, is a tongue-in-cheek ode to the critically maligned romantic comedy View from the Top starring Gwyneth Paltrow. The Financial Times included Ayoade on Top in its collection of the best books of 2019 and Ayoade was ranked 33rd of the 50 best comedians of the 21st century in a 2019 list published by The Guardian.

In May 2020, it was announced that Ayoade would host the 2020 British Academy Television Awards, which was held behind closed doors due to the COVID-19 pandemic. He returned to host the 2021 and 2022 ceremonies.

Influences
Ayoade is a fan of French New Wave cinema and said in an interview with The Guardian that Louis Malle's Zazie dans le Métro was the film that sparked his interest in filmmaking. His favourite filmmakers include Malle, Woody Allen, Ingmar Bergman, Orson Welles, Jean-Luc Godard, Jean-Pierre Melville, and Paul Thomas Anderson.

Ayoade participated in the 2012 Sight & Sound directors' poll, where he listed his 10 favourite films: The Apartment, Badlands, Barry Lyndon, Crimes and Misdemeanors, Make Way for Tomorrow, Contempt, Ordet, Persona, Raging Bull, and Tokyo Story.

Personal life
In 2007, Ayoade married Lydia Fox, a member of the Fox family of actors. They have three children and live in the East Dulwich area of London. 

His brother-in-law, actor Laurence Fox, courted Ayoade's chagrin publicly in 2020, when he asked Ayoade to announce his support for him on Twitter after a controversial appearance on Question Time. The episode in question was condemned for allowing Fox on as a guest, in particular for when he told a Black woman in the audience that discussing racism was "boring". According to Fox, Ayoade told him that "You have never encountered racism." Fox stated that he had told Ayoade he had, because "he worked in Kenya once" and "racism can be deferential".

Filmography

Films

Television

Music videos directed

Bibliography

References

External links

Richard Ayoade | Culture | The Guardian
Richard Ayoade on the British Film Institute
Richard Ayoade on the Danish Film Institute
Richard Ayoade on the Swedish Film Institute
Richard Ayoade on the Financial Times
Richard Ayoade news and commentary on the Evening Standard

1977 births
Living people
20th-century English screenwriters
20th-century English comedians
20th-century English male actors
20th-century English male writers
21st-century British screenwriters
21st-century English comedians
21st-century English male actors
21st-century English male writers
Actors from Ipswich
Alumni of St Catharine's College, Cambridge
Audiobook narrators
Best Male Comedy Performance BAFTA Award (television) winners
Black British filmmakers
Black British male comedians
Black British male actors
British directors
British film directors
British male comedy actors
British male television writers
British people of Norwegian descent
British people of Yoruba descent
Comedians from London
English film directors
English male film actors
English male screenwriters
English male singers
English male television actors
English male voice actors
English music video directors
English people of Norwegian descent
Male actors from London
Male actors from Suffolk
People educated at St Joseph's College, Ipswich
People from Hammersmith
Robin Fox family